Kenora was an Ontario provincial electoral district in northwestern Ontario until 1999.

History
Kenora has been a provincial riding since the early twentieth century. For many years, the Members of the Legislative Assembly (MLAs) that it elected sat as "Labour" or "Liberal-Labour" members.

The riding elected Peter Heenan as a Labour representative in the 1919 provincial election. Heenan remained one of only four Labour MLAs re-elected in the 1923 election. He entered federal politics in the 1925 federal election and was elected a Liberal MP and served as Minister of Labour in William Lyon Mackenzie King's Cabinet.

In the 1929 election, Earl Hutchinson recaptured Kenora as a Labour candidate. He was re-elected in the 1934 provincial election, but gave up the seat to make way for Heenan who was to be appointed to cabinet. Heenan ran in the subsequent by-election, this time as a Liberal Party candidate, and was elected. He joined Mitchell Hepburn's Cabinet and served as Minister of Mines and Forests (1934–1941) and Minister of Labour (1941–1943).

Heenan was defeated by William Docker of the Co-operative Commonwealth Federation (a social democratic party) in the 1943 election that routed the Liberals and reduced them to third party status. Subsequently, the Liberals ran Albert Wren as a "Liberal-Labour" candidate unsuccessfully in the 1948 election before his victory in the 1951 election.

Albert Wren of Kenora was the longest serving "Liberal-Labour" Member of Provincial Parliament (MPP, as MLAs were called after 1938), sitting in the Ontario legislature from 1951 until his death in 1961. He ran for the leadership of the Ontario Liberal Party in 1954, coming in second, and again in 1958, coming in last.  Robert Gibson succeeded Wren as the "Liberal-Labour" MPP for Kenora and served until the 1967 election.

T. Patrick Reid was elected "Liberal-Labour" MPP for the neighbouring riding of Rainy River in the 1967 election He ran as a "Liberal" in the 1971 election, and 1975 election. He reverted to the "Liberal-Labour" label for the 1977 election, and returned to being a "Liberal" MPP in 1981 election, and left politics in 1985.

The riding was abolished into Kenora—Rainy River prior to the 1999 election when provincial ridings were defined to have the same borders as federal ridings.  It will not be recreated for the next election, because the ridings in Northern Ontario are not changing provincially.

Members of Provincial Parliament

References

Former provincial electoral districts of Ontario